Michael William Fisher (born March 3, 1958) is an American prelate of the Roman Catholic Church who currently serves as the bishop of the Diocese of Buffalo, having been installed on January 15, 2021. He previously served as an auxiliary bishop of the Archdiocese of Washington.

Biography

Early life 
Michael Fisher was born on March 3, 1958, in Baltimore, Maryland, the eldest of five children. As a child, he was a newspaper deliverer for the Baltimore Sun and later worked at a gas station.

Fisher attended Baltimore Polytechnic Institute high school and is an Eagle Scout. He later earned a bachelor of science (B.S.) in business administration and accounting at the University of Maryland in 1984. Fisher worked as a comptroller for a psychiatric practice in Bethesda, Maryland, before entering seminary at Mount Saint Mary’s Seminary in Emmitsburg, Maryland, in 1986.

Priesthood 
Fisher was ordained a priest for the Archdiocese of Washington by Cardinal James A. Hickey on June 23, 1990. Fisher worked as a priest at Sacred Heart Parish in La Plata, Maryland, as pastor of Holy Family Parish in Hillcrest Heights, Maryland, in 1995, and as pastor at St. John Neumann Parish in Gaithersburg, Maryland, in 1999. Fisher was named a chaplain to His Holiness by Pope John Paul II in 2005.

In 2005, then-Archbishop Theodore McCarrick appointed Fisher vicar general for the apostolates, in which role he oversaw the archdiocesan ministries for education, ethnic ministries, social justice and service, parish life and youth ministry. In 2006, Cardinal Donald Wuerl appointed Fisher as vicar for clergy and secretary for ministerial leadership.

Fisher has served on various archdiocesan boards and committees, including the College of Consultors, the Priest Council, the Administrative Board, the Priest Retirement Board, the Clergy Personnel Board, the Deacon Review Board, the Deacon Council, the Needy Parish Committee, and the Forward in Faith Committee.

Auxiliary bishop of Washington 

Pope Francis appointed Fisher as an auxiliary bishop for the Archdiocese of Washington on June 8, 2018. Fisher was consecrated by Cardinal Wuerl on June 29, 2018.

Fisher's coat of arms as an auxiliary referenced those of several past archbishops. The colors of red and gold were used in the coats of arms of Archbishops Hickey, McCarrick, and Wuerl. The line embattled and red crosses reference the tower embattled and red cross in Wuerl's coat of arms. The lion, in addition to representing Fisher's patron saint, Mark the Evangelist, references the lion on Hickey's coat of arms.

Bishop of Buffalo
On December 1, 2020, Francis named Fisher as Bishop of the Diocese Buffalo. Regarding the sex abuse allegations against priests in the diocese, Fisher made this statement:“Trust has been broken. Because of the clergy abuse, as well as other things. I really feel we need to rebuild that trust through our actions. Part of that will be looking out for those who are vulnerable and in need of our healing. I want to be part of the healing process.”Fisher's installation occurred on January 15, 2021.

See also
 Wilton Daniel Gregory
 Catholic Church hierarchy
 Catholic Church in the United States
 Historical list of the Catholic bishops of the United States
 List of Catholic bishops of the United States
 Lists of patriarchs, archbishops, and bishops

References

External links

 Roman Catholic Diocese of Buffalo Official Site  
Roman Catholic Archdiocese of Washington Official Site

 
 

1958 births
Living people
Religious leaders from Baltimore
21st-century Roman Catholic bishops in the United States
Bishops appointed by Pope Francis